Reel Corporation is an independent Australian film distributor. Reel Corporation Australia established a joint venture sales company with Roadshow Entertainment called Reel DVD.

History
Reel Corporation distributes many films, children's programmes and television series.  It also deals with independent studio film titles which would only receive limited releases in cinemas. Whereas Village Roadshow would release blockbusters and major films from studios such as Warner Bros. and New Line Cinema.

Reel Corporation would also handle genre titles which didn't necessarily have big studio output deals, which aided in international distribution for films which include Teaching Mrs. Tingle and Bride of Chucky.

Revival
Starting in February 2007, Village Roadshow allocated many of its 'smaller' titles to Reel DVD to be repackaged and re-distributed, and sold at discount prices. These also included big budget films like Jason X and The Art of War which hadn't achieved high sales on DVD. They were submitted for Revision at the Office of Film and Literature Classification (Australia's censorship board) and officially given new Classification logos and simpler Classification Advice.

Reel continues to distribute small-scale and direct-to-DVD films.

See also

List of companies of Australia
List of film production companies
List of television production companies

References

Film production companies of Australia